Auriat is a commune in the Creuse department in the Nouvelle-Aquitaine region in central France.

Geography

Population

Sights
 The church, dating from the sixteenth century.
 The Château de la Baconnaille.

See also
Communes of the Creuse department

References

Communes of Creuse